Steen is an alternative spelling of the Swedish and Danish word sten meaning stone; it is also a shortened form of Ollisteen. It is the given name of the following people

Steen Bille (d. 1606), Danish diplomat
Steen Andersen Bille, a family of Danish naval officers
Steen Andersen Bille (1751–1833), Danish naval officer
Steen Andersen Bille (1797–1883), Danish vice-admiral
Steen Steensen Blicher (1782–1848), Danish author
Steen Blicher (footballer) (born 1923), Danish association football player
Steen Steensen Blicher (footballer) (1899–1965), Danish association football player
Steen Due (1898–1974), Danish field hockey player
Steen Fenrich (1981–1999), African-American murder victim 
Steen Fladberg (born 1956), Danish badminton player
Steen Lund Hansen (born 1943), Danish sprint canoeist
Steen Herschend (1888–1976), Danish sailor
Steen Hildebrandt (born in 1944), Danish academic and author
Steen Krarup Jensen (born 1950), Danish sculptor, poet, songwriter and social critic
Steen Rømer Larsen (born 1949), Danish association football player
Steen Mastrup (born 1958), Danish motorcycle speedway rider
Steen Miles (1946-2017), American politician
Steen Nedergaard (born 1970), Danish association football player
Steen Ottesen Brahe (1547–1620), Danish politician
Steen Pade (born 1956), Danish composer
Steen Raskopoulos (born 1987), Australian comedian, actor and improviser
Steen Rasmussen (physicist) (born 1955), Danish physicist
Steen Eiler Rasmussen (1898–1990), Danish architect and urban planner
Steen Secher (born 1959), Danish sailor
Steen Skovgaard (born 1950), Danish badminton player
Steen Spore (born 1938), Danish official
Steen Thychosen (born 1958), Danish association football player
Steen Tinning (born 1962), Danish golfer
Steen Willadsen (born 1943), Danish scientist